Gibberula cherubini is a species of sea snail, a marine gastropod mollusk in the family Marginellidae, the margin snails.

Description
The shell size is 3.6 mm.

Distribution
This species occurs in the Indian Ocean off Madagascar, the Seychelles and Réunion.

References

 Bavay, A., 1922. Coquilles des sables littoraux marins. Journal de Conchyliologie 67: 57–66
 Dautzenberg, Ph. (1929). Mollusques testacés marins de Madagascar. Faune des Colonies Francaises, Tome III
 Cossignani T. (2006) Una nuova Gibberula dal Mar Rosso (Gastropoda: Prosobranchia, Cystiscidae). Malacologia Mostra Mondiale 50: 11.

cherubini
Gastropods described in 1922